Trece Martires, officially the City of Trece Martires, is a 4th class component city  and de facto capital city of the province of Cavite, Philippines. According to the 2020 census, it has a population of 210,503 people.

The city was the provincial capital of Cavite until President Ferdinand Marcos transferred it to Imus on June 11, 1977. Despite the capital's relocation, the city still hosts many offices of the provincial government. According to the 2020 census, it has a population of 210,503 people, and an income classification of 1st class.

Etymology 
Trece Martires (Spanish for thirteen martyrs) is named after the Thirteen Martyrs of Cavite, a group of prominent Caviteños who were convicted of rebellion and executed by the Spanish colonial government on September 12, 1896, in the old port city of Cavite during the Philippine Revolution.

History

Township
Trece Martires started as one of the largest and most remote barrios of Cavite. Originally named Quinta or Quintana, it was part of the municipality of Tanza. The land was basically agricultural subdivided into cattle ranches and sugar farms, with less than 1,000 hectares, at the intersection of the present Tanza–Trece Martires–Indang Road (Tanza–Trece Martires Road / Trece Martires–Indang Road) and the Naic–Dasmariñas Road (now part of Governor's Drive).

Cityhood

The city was established on May 24, 1954, under Republic Act No. 981 ("The Charter of Trece Martires City") as approved by President Ramon Magsaysay. The Republic Act also transferred the provincial seat of government from Cavite City to Trece Martires. The original bill, House Bill 1795, was authored by Congressman Jose T. Cajulis (1954–1957) and Senator Justiniano S. Montano (1949–1956).

Under the city charter, the Governor of Cavite is ex-officio mayor of Trece Martires; then-Governor Dominador Mangubat was installed as the city's first chief executive. On January 2, 1956, the provincial capitol was formally inaugurated, the same day the newly elected Governor, Delfin N. Montano (the son of former Senator Justiniano Montano) was sworn into office. He served in both offices from 1956 to 1971.

Expansion
Consequently, the municipalities of Indang and General Trias had to yield parts of their respective areas to this territorial expansion.

Loss of provincial capital status
On June 11, 1977, President Ferdinand Marcos signed Presidential Decree No. 1163, relocating the capital and seat of government of Cavite from Trece Martires to the municipality of Imus. Governor Juanito Remulla requested Marcos in September 1979 to transfer the capital back to the city, but his request was not approved. As of 2011, the provincial capital is the city of Imus, but most of the provincial offices are in Trece Martires, making Trece Martires the de facto capital of the province and Imus the de jure capital.

On March 31, 1992, President Corazon Aquino signed Republic Act No. 7325, which amended the charter of Trece Martires, allowing the city to vote their own local officials for the first time.

Contemporary history 
Vice Mayor Alexander Lubigan was assassinated in front of a hospital along the Trece Martires–Indang Road in Trece Martires on July 7, 2018. Following this event, the Presidential Anti-Corruption Commission (PACC) initiated a graft probe parallel to the investigation of the vice mayor's slaying. Before the assassination, Lubigan was expressively intent to run for Mayor against Mayor Melandres de Sagun's wife, Roniza. Melandres was intended to run for Congress to represent the reapportioned 7th district consisting of Amadeo, Indang, Tanza, and Trece Martires. Lubigan's wife, Gemma, became mayor one year later.

Geography
Trece Martires is in the heart of Cavite Province. It is bounded north and northwest by the municipality of Tanza, west and southwest by the municipality of Naic, south by the municipality of Indang, southeast by the municipality of Amadeo and east by the city of General Trias.

Topography
Its ground slope ranges from 0.5 to 2%.

The land area is fairy well dissected by creeks and streams that are deeply cut, characterized by steep and abrupt banks. These almost parallel drainage lines flow in northern direction to discharge into either Manila Bay or Laguna de Bay.

Climate
Trece Martires City has a tropical climate (Köppen climate classification: Aw) with two pronounced seasons: wet and dry. Wet season covers the period from May to December of each year; dry season covers January to April.

Barangays
Trece Martires City is politically subdivided into 13 barangays (six urban and seven rural). The city was subdivided by Senator Justiniano Montano and Congressman Jose Cajulis. Each barangay was named after one of the Thirteen Martyrs of Cavite to commemorate their bravery and heroism. Below are the names of the barangays and their names before the city's Charter was passed on May 24, 1954.

Demographics

Economy

Industrialisation and commercialism has replaced agriculture as the major source of economy for the city. Its economic growth has attracted immigration from other municipalities especially from Metro Manila. The population grown from 104,559 people in 2010 to 155,713 in 2015, representing an increase of 7.88%. In comparison, the population in 1995 was only 20,451. The city's other major source of income are revenues from real property taxes.

The most noteworthy fact about Trece Martires is the absence of any form of gambling. It has been awarded in the fields of nutrition, health services, literacy, education and social services.

For the past years (2010-onwards), the city gradually developed its economy for it supported the construction of Walter Mart Trece Martires, the largest Walter Mart in Cavite along Governor's Drive, which was opened on November 29, 2012, and two Puregold stores in Barangays Hugo Perez and San Agustin. In September 2015, Trece Tower Mall was opened, while SM City Trece Martires, the fifth SM Supermall in Cavite was opened on May 13, 2016.

Infrastructure
The city government provides the following assistance: financial, medical, emergency, school fees and burial expenses. It has extensive programs for the elderly, solo parents, out-of-school youth, and mothers. One of its programs is a blood donation activity every March, May, September and December; Balik Eskwela (school supplies distribution to all public elementary and high school students); clean and green; revitalization of agricultural lands, high school and college scholarship and their livelihood programs.

Healthcare
The Gen. Emilio Aguinaldo Memorial Hospital in Barangay Luciano is a government-run hospital for the people of the city which has a 250-bed capacity. The hospitals in the city that are owned and run privately are Korea-Philippines Friendship Hospital in Barangay Luciano; the MV Santiago Medical Center in Barangay De Ocampo; the Treceño Medical Pavillon Hospital in Barangay Luciano.

Trece Martires has a mental health facility for people in the city near Gen. Emilio Aguinaldo Memorial Hospital.

Several clinics are in the city for maternal health. There is ERS Maternity and Jade building in Luciano and other several clinics in the city.

Security
 Barangay Osorio
 Barangay Inocencio
 Barangay De Ocampo
 Barangay Conchu

Fire Department
The fire station of the city is in Barangay San Agustin.

Government

City officials

Barangay officials

Education

High schools

 Trece Martires City National High School – Main (San Agustin Campus)
 Eugenio Cabezas National High School (formerly known as TMCNHS – Cabezas Annex)
 Francisco Osorio Integrated Senior High School (formerly known as Francisco Osorio National High School and TMCNHS – Osorio Annex)
 Luis Aguado National High School (formerly known as TMCNHS – Southville Annex)
 Trece Martires City National High School – Conchu Annex
 Trece Martires City National High School – Cabuco Extension
 Fiscal Mundo National High School (formerly Luis Aguado National High School Extension)

Trece Martires City schools were awarded to be the most ready in the country on the Brigada Eskwela 2012 of Department of Education. Trece Martires City Elementary School topped the Exceptional Category for Elementary Schools in Region IV-A and Trece Martires City National High School was first in the Exceptional Category for Secondary Schools.

Private schools

Academy of St. John Nepomucene
Amore International School (Amore Academy)
Blessed Family Academy
Blessed Kateri School 
Braintrust Learning Center inc.
Christian Child Development Learning Center
Colegio de Santa Rosa
Dei Gracia Academy
Elim Christian Academy
Fabulous Christian Academy
Gateway International School of Science and Technology
God is Good Learning Center
John Merced Academy
Krislizz International Academy
Lyceum of Cavite-East
Maranatha Christian Academy
Marella Christianne Institute
New Generation International School
Notre Dame of Trece Martires
Our Lady of Lourdes Academy Learning Center
Paul Henry
Saint Jude Parish School
Saint Thomas Becket Academy
Santo Niño de Praga Academy
Sun Moon Academy
Sung Kwang Global Leadership Academy
Trece Martires Integrated Laboratory School

Colleges
Cavite State University – Trece Martires City Campus
Colegio de Amore
Imus Computer College (ICC) – Trece Martires City Branch
Trece Martires City College

Annual events 
 The town fiesta of Trece Martires City is celebrated every October 27–28 in honor of Saint Jude Thaddeus.
 The charter anniversary known as Araw ng Trece Martires (Trece Martires Day) is celebrated on May 24 each year.
 Feast of Holy Cross is celebrated on September 14.
 The Death Anniversary of Thirteen Martyrs of Cavite is celebrated annually during September 12 to commemorate the martyrdom of the Thirteen Martyrs who were executed for joining the revolt of Katipunan during the Spanish Era. Activities like exhibits and the reenactment of the Thirteen Martyrs are done during the yearly celebration.

Sister cities

International
  Tainan, Taiwan

Local
 Makati, Metro Manila
 Zamboanga City (since 2009)

References

External links

Official website of the City of Trece Martires
 [ Philippine Standard Geographic Code]
2010 Philippine Census Information

Cities in Cavite
Planned cities in the Philippines
Provincial capitals of the Philippines
Populated places established in 1954
1954 establishments in the Philippines
Component cities in the Philippines